A list of films produced by the Marathi language film industry based in Maharashtra in the year 1990.

1990 Releases
A list of Marathi films released in 1990.

References

Lists of 1990 films by country or language
 Marathi
1990